This is a list of episodes from the reality television series Storage Wars: New York, which airs on the cable network A&E Network. The episodes listed here are in a broadcast order, not production order. The series debuted on January 1, 2013. The descriptions of the items listed in this article reflect those given by their sellers and others in the episodes prior to their appraisal by experts as authentic or inauthentic, unless otherwise noted.

Series overview

Episodes

Season 1 (2013)

Season 2 (2013)

Episodes Statistics

Season 1 (2013)

Season 2 (2013)

Other Notes
 In "The Walking Bid" episode, Big Steve spent $1,100 and profited $1,600.
In "An Embarrassment of Richards" episode, Big Steve spent $200 and profited $1,150.
In "Da Bronx Tale" episode, Joe P. and The Fog worked as a team. Additionally, Candy and Courtney's profit in this episode represents their take from a pop up sale they staged, not from an item appraisal, as the only item of worth in their room was the gumball machine.
In "Legends of the Fog" episode, The Fog spent $1,100 and profited $2,630. Candy and Courtney did not appear in this episode.
In "The Forgotten Borough" episode, Big Steve spent $675 and profited $1,300. Chris and Tad did not appear in this episode.
In "East River Gold" episode, Big Steve spent $900 and profited $740.
In "Bid with a Bang" episode, The Fog did not buy a locker. Chris and Tad did not appear in this episode.
In "Bid Master Funk" episode, Big Steve spent $1,000 and profited $425.
In "It Takes A Queen's Village" episode, Big Steve did not buy a locker.
In "Drags To Riches" episode, Big Steve spent $1,200 and profited $122. Big Steve's season finished with him spending $5,075 and profiting $5,337.

References

External links
 

Lists of American reality television series episodes
Episodes New York